Walter Leslie Guy (25 October 1910 – 28 March 1978) was an  Australian rules footballer who played with North Melbourne in the Victorian Football League (VFL).

Family
One of the nine children of Willie Guy (1886–1946), and Ruby May Guy (1889–1960), née Sawyer, Walter Leslie Guy was born on 25 October 1910.

His youngest brother, Eric Arthur Guy (1932–1991) played for St Kilda Football Club. A nephew, Gary Guy (1952–), the son of another of his brothers, Ivan, played for the Melbourne Football Club.

Football
He was cleared from Carrum Football Club to North Melbourne Football Club on 20 June 1934.

Notes

References

External links 

1910 births
1978 deaths
Australian rules footballers from Victoria (Australia)
North Melbourne Football Club players